Ronald Chagoury (born 8 January 1949) is a Nigerian businessman, the co-founder (with his billionaire brother Gilbert Chagoury), and CEO of the Chagoury Group.

Biography
Ronald Chagoury was born in Nigeria on 8 January 1949, the son of Ramez and Alice Chagoury, who had emigrated from Lebanon in the 1940s. He was educated at the College des Frères Chrétiens in Lebanon, and studied business studies at California State University, Long Beach, US.

Chagoury is married to Berthe, and they have two children.

Chagoury's name has appeared in the Panama Papers.

References

1949 births
20th-century Nigerian businesspeople
21st-century Nigerian businesspeople
Businesspeople from Lagos
Nigerian construction businesspeople
California State University, Long Beach alumni
Living people
Nigerian people of Lebanese descent
Nigerian real estate businesspeople
People named in the Panama Papers
Nigerian billionaires